Minerbio (Eastern Bolognese:  or ) is a comune (municipality) in the Metropolitan City of Bologna in the northern-central Italian region Emilia-Romagna, located about  northeast of Bologna.

Minerbio borders the following municipalities: Baricella, Bentivoglio, Budrio, Granarolo dell'Emilia and Malalbergo.

Twin towns — sister cities
Minerbio is twinned with:

  Camugnano, Italy
  Hirrlingen, Germany 
  Hajós, Hungary

See also 
 Minerbium, Latin name of Minervino Murge, town and former bishopric in Apulia

References

External links 
 Official website

Cities and towns in Emilia-Romagna